The Monster's Christmas is a 1981 New Zealand Christmas fantasy television film produced by Television New Zealand.

The movie tells the tale of a young girl who is approached by a monster from one of her storybooks to help him and other monsters regain their voices that have been stolen by a wicked witch. According to distributor Gibson Group, it was "deliberately written and planned as a location film, it incorporates many of New Zealand’s beautiful scenic spots". A region 1 DVD was released in 2004.

See also
 List of Christmas films

References

External links

New Zealand Christmas films
1981 films
New Zealand children's films
Christmas television films
1980s children's films
1980s English-language films